Stade Goho is a multi-use stadium in Abomey, Benin.  It is currently used mostly for football matches and is the home ground of Dynamo Abomey F.C. of the Benin Premier League.  The stadium has a capacity of 7,500 spectators.

References

External links
 Stadium information

Football venues in Benin